Nigel Andrew Lincoln Clarke (born 20 October 1971) is Minister of Finance and the Public Service of Jamaica. He is a Jamaican Member of Parliament, company director, business executive and statesman. He has served as chairman or director of over 20 Jamaican public and private sector economic enterprises.  His public sector directorships have included the Bank of Jamaica (Jamaica's central bank and financial services regulator); Chairman of the Port Authority of Jamaica (the regulator of Jamaica's ports and the developer and owner of Jamaica's cargo and cruise ports); Chairman of the National Housing Trust (Jamaica's state-owned mortgage lender and housing developer) and Chairman of the HEART Trust NTA (Jamaica's largest tertiary level vocational training and certification institution). In 2016, Dr. Clarke was appointed by the Most Hon. Andrew Holness, Prime Minister of Jamaica, to serve as Jamaica's Ambassador-at-Large for Economic Affairs within the Office of the Prime Minister. Ambassador Clarke previously served as a Senator in the Upper House of the Jamaican parliament between 2013 and 2015.

Prior to his government service, Clarke served as Vice Chairman of the Musson Group, having served previously as chief operating officer and chief financial officer of the Group and as chief executive officer of its major subsidiaries. Clarke played an integral executive leadership role in the expansion of the Musson Group from a substantially Jamaican base to having operations and subsidiaries in over 30 countries with over US$1 billion in revenues and market leading businesses in telecommunications, information technology, consumer goods and food manufacturing. The Musson Group is a leading Jamaica-based multinational with four associated companies that are listed on the Jamaica Stock Exchange and over 50 other privately held subsidiaries and associated companies. Clarke's executive business experience spanned leadership of transnational mergers and acquisitions, corporate leadership, business development and emerging market business leadership.

Clarke is married and has two children. Clarke attended St. Richards Primary School in Kingston and graduated from Munro College in St. Elizabeth Jamaica, where he was awarded the Jamaica Independent Scholarship, for study at the University of the West Indies (UWI). He graduated from UWI with a First-Class Honours degree in Mathematics and Computer Science, and won the prize for the best degree with the highest marks among students in the Faculty of Natural Sciences across all campuses of UWI in Jamaica, Trinidad and Barbados.  He was awarded the Commonwealth Scholarship to attend Linacre College, Oxford University, where he earned an MSc degree in Applied Statistics. In his thesis he examined volatility on the Jamaica Stock Exchange. He subsequently won a Rhodes Scholarship and earned a Doctor of Philosophy degree in Mathematics (Numerical Analysis) from Oxford University (also at Linacre College).

Career

Political leadership 
Clarke currently serves as Member of Parliament for the North West St. Andrew constituency, after winning the by-election to that seat held on 5 March 2018.  He has previously served as Senator in the Upper House of the Jamaican Parliament from 2013 to 2015. He is currently the Minister of Finance in Jamaica.

Leadership in business and finance 
Nigel Clarke played a leadership role in the growth and expansion of the Musson Group from a base in Jamaica to having operations and subsidiaries in over 30 countries in the Caribbean, Central America, Europe and the Pacific.

Clarke is recognised for having led, managed or executed dozens of acquisitions and corporate transactions on behalf of the Musson Group across many sectors. Notable transactions include the acquisition of Nestle's manufacturing business in Jamaica, the acquisition of Kraft Foods manufacturing business in Jamaica, the acquisition of the Serge dairy businesses, the acquisition of several technology-related and telecom businesses in the Caribbean, Central America and Europe among several other such transactions.

Clarke started his career as a derivatives trader in London at Goldman Sachs, the prestigious international investment bank.  Since returning to Jamaica in 1999, he has structured and negotiated over US$1 billion of inbound investment for private equity, business development, acquisition finance, trade finance and infrastructure development. Notable private sector transactions include: the securing of over US$300m of direct private equity and debt investment for Jamaican businesses from major international banks and multilateral financial institutions including Citibank NA, the International Finance Corporation, the Inter American Development Bank, the European Investment Bank and the Caribbean Development Bank; the first ever regionally syndicated, locally arranged loan (US$182 million) spanning several jurisdictions in the Caribbean and Central America and across multiple currencies to fund business growth and development across the Caribbean and Central America; the foundation and development of the first ever fund established in the region to finance regional private equity and venture capital (the US$32m Caribbean Investment Fund); and the foundation of Jamaica's first specialist investment fund dedicated to mezzanine financing for business growth (the US$15m Caribbean Mezzanine Fund). Notable public sector initiatives include the completion of the US$400 million transaction to divest and expand the Kingston Container Terminal; the facilitation of over 5200 new housing starts in 2017 by way of direct construction, direct financing and financing partnerships with financial institutions (representing the fastest pace of low cost housing construction in Jamaica over two decades); and the role of principal interlocutor with the International Monetary Fund, on behalf of the Government of Jamaica, in negotiating the early successful termination of the Extended Fund Facility agreement and the entry into the US$1.6 billion Precautionary Stand-By Arrangement with the Fund. He has delivered policy related addresses to the annual general meetings or other high level fora of the International Monetary Fund, the Organisation of American States, the Clinton Global Initiative and the Caribbean Development Bank.

Clarke's private sector directorships have cut across several industries and include: in the trading and manufacturing sector, Vice Chairman of the Musson Group (a privately held distribution enterprise covering food, technology and telecommunications and employing 5,000 persons across 30 countries), in the financial services sector, the NCB Financial Group (Jamaica's largest financial services holding company), where he also served as a member of the bank's credit committee; in the manufacturing, sector, Red Stripe (the brewing and bottling company); in the agri-business and food processing sectors, Jamaican Broilers Group and Seprod Limited (which collectively include the largest protein, dairy, vegetable oil, and grain producers and distributors operating in Jamaica) In addition, Clarke has served as Chairman of Eppley Limited, a company listed on the Jamaica Stock Exchange that specialises in sourcing, originating and investing in credit-related opportunities. He has also served as Vice Chairman of the PBS Group, the largest regional business solutions and technology distribution company in the Caribbean region with operations and subsidiaries throughout 14 countries of Central America and the Caribbean, which is listed on the Jamaica Stock Exchange.

In addition to his leadership of major economic institutions in the Jamaican public and private sector, Clarke is nationally recognised for his leadership in education and youth empowerment.  He served as Chairman of the Heart Trust NTA (Jamaica's largest tertiary level vocational training and certification institution); and founder and Chairman of the National Youth Orchestra of Jamaica which delivers music for social change programmes in Jamaica; He has also produced and hosted the Jamaica International Chess Festival with Grandmaster Maurice Ashley and produced concerts at Carnegie Hall and the Kennedy Center featuring Jamaican artists. His international educational affiliations include service as a Director of the Youth Orchestra of the Americas and the role of Co-organiser and Host of TEDx Jamaica.

Education 
Clarke holds a Bachelor's degree in Mathematics and Computer Science from the University of the West Indies, Mona on the Jamaica Independence Scholarship where he graduated in 1992 . He also graduated from the University of Oxford with a Master's Degree in Applied Statistics in 1994 and a Doctor of Philosophy (PhD) in Numerical Analysis in 1997. This was done through the Commonwealth Scholarship and the Rhodes Scholarship respectively.

Honours 
 Dr Clarke was handed the Kiwanis Community Service Award in 2012 from the Kiwanis Club of Kingston.
 Dr. Clarke was also handed the PSOJ "50 under 50" Business Leadership Award in 2012 by the Private Sector Organisation of Jamaica.

References 

University of the West Indies alumni
Finance ministers of Jamaica
Government ministers of Jamaica
Members of the Senate of Jamaica
Living people
International Monetary Fund people
Musson
Computer scientists
1971 births
People educated at Munro College
Members of the Inter-American Dialogue
21st-century Jamaican politicians
Members of the 14th Parliament of Jamaica